Freshman year is the first year of high school or college.

Freshman Year may also refer to:
 
 Freshman Year (Hop Along album), a 2006 album by Hop Along
 Freshman Year (album), a 2019 album by The Reklaws
 Freshman Year (film), a 1938 film
 Shithouse (film), a 2020 film released under the title Freshman Year in certain territories
Freshman Year (reality show), a political reality show starring Jason Chaffetz and Jared Polis that CNN aired on the internet in 2009
 Spider-Man: Freshman Year, an upcoming animated Disney+ series in the Marvel Cinematic Universe